Wickersham Dome (Lower Tanana: Khoodeneldeł) is a summit in the Yukon–Koyukuk Census Area, Alaska, located  northwest of Fairbanks near the Elliott Highway. It is named after Wickersham Creek, which heads on the southeast slope of Wickersham Dome. The creek itself is named for James Wickersham.

It is a popular hiking destination in the White Mountains National Recreation Area.

References

Landforms of Yukon–Koyukuk Census Area, Alaska